The year 2023 in architecture is expected to involve some significant architectural events and new buildings.

Buildings and structures

Egypt
 Grand Egyptian Museum in Giza, designed by Heneghan Peng Architects, projected for completion

Malaysia
 Merdeka 118 in Kuala Lumpur, designed by Fender Katsalidis in association with RSP KL, projected for completion

Poland
 Museum of Modern Art, Warsaw in Warsaw, designed by Thomas Phifer and Partners, projected for completion

United Kingdom
 June – Factory International arts venue in Manchester, designed by Office for Metropolitan Architecture (OMA; lead architect Ellen van Loon) projected for opening.

United States
 Buffalo AKG Art Museum in Buffalo, New York, projected for completion

Awards
 AIA Gold Medal – Carol Ross Barney 
 Driehaus Architecture Prize for New Classical Architecture – Ben Pentreath
 Pritzker Architecture Prize – David Chipperfield
 RIBA Royal Gold Medal –
 Stirling Prize –

Exhibitions
 Venice Biennale of Architecture: 20 May – 26 November
 Copenhagen Architecture Festival x FILM: 1 – 11 June

Deaths
 January 6 – William S.W. Lim, 90, Singaporean architect (b. 1932)
 January 12 – Vittorio Garatti, 95, Italian architect (b. 1927)
 January 24 – Balkrishna Vithaldas Doshi, 95, Indian architect, Pritzker Prize winner (2018) (b. 1927)
 January 31 – Graham Winteringham, 99, English architect (Crescent Theatre) (b. 1923) (death announced on this date)
 February 13 – Robert Geddes, 99, American architect, dean of the Princeton University School of Architecture (1965–1982) (b. 1923)
 February 17 – Peter Muller, 95, Australian architect (b. 1927)
 March 2 – Rafael Viñoly, 78, Uruguayan-born architect (b. 1944)

See also
Timeline of architecture

References

 
2023-related lists
21st-century architecture